
Year 1504 (MDIV) was a leap year starting on Monday (link will display the full calendar) of the Julian calendar.

Events 

 January–June 
 January 1 – French troops of King Louis XII surrender Gaeta to the Spanish, under Gonzalo Fernández de Córdoba.
 January 21 – After the death of Sten Sture the Elder on December 14 the year before, Svante Nilsson is elected the new Regent of Sweden.
 January 31 – Treaty of Lyon: France cedes Naples to Ferdinand II of Aragon, who becomes King of Naples as Ferdinand III.
 February 29 – Christopher Columbus uses his knowledge of a lunar eclipse this night, to convince the indigenous Jamaican people to provide him with supplies.
 April 1 – English guilds become subject to state control.
 April 23 – Maximilian I, Holy Roman Emperor, routes troops to Bavaria.

 July–December 
 September 8 –  Michelangelo's sculpture of David is completed in Florence.
 September 13 – Queen Isabella and King Ferdinand issue a Royal Warrant for the construction of Capilla Real, a Royal Chapel, to be built in Granada.
 September 22 – Treaty of Blois: Philip I of Castile, Maximilian I and Louis XII agree to terms.
 October 12 – Isabella I of Castile signs her will and testament.
 November 7 – Christopher Columbus returns to Spain from his fourth voyage, during which he and his younger son, Ferdinand, explored the coast of Central America from Belize to Panama.
 November 26 – On the death of Isabella I of Castile, Catholic Queen of Castile and Aragon, the Crown of Castile passes to her daughter Joanna.
 December 8 (approximate date) – Islamic scholar Ahmad ibn Abi Jum'ah issues the Oran fatwa for Muslims in Spain (1 Rajab 910 AH in Islamic calendar, Gregorian date is approximate).
 December 24 –  Knut Alvsson's rebellion was crushed at Olsborg Castle in Båhuslen.

 Date unknown 
 Babur besieges and captures Kabul.
 Islamization of the Sudan region: A Funj leader, Amara Dunqas, founds the Sultanate of Sennar.
 Sheikh Ahmad, final leader of the Great Horde, is last heard of as a Lithuanian prisoner at Vilnius.
 Juan de la Cosa begins his first independent voyage, to the Isthmus of Panama.
 In Florence, Leonardo da Vinci and Niccolò Machiavelli become involved in a scheme to divert the Arno River, cutting the water supply to Pisa to force its surrender: Colombino, the project foreman, fails to follow da Vinci's design, and the project is a major failure.
 Venetian ambassadors suggest to Turkey the construction of a Suez Canal.
 Aldus Manutius publishes his edition of Demosthenes in Venice.
 Matthias Grünewald paints a  Crucifixion.
 The Signoria of Florence commissions both Leonardo da Vinci and Michelangelo to paint the walls of the Grand Council Chamber in the Palazzo Vecchio.
 Raphael paints The Marriage of the Virgin, which exemplifies some major principles of High Renaissance art.

Births 

 January 1 – Caspar Creuziger, German humanist (d. 1548)
 January 17 – Pope Pius V (d. 1572)
 January 28 – Anna II, Princess-Abbess of Quedlinburg, German noblewoman, reigning from 1516 until her death (d. 1574)
 February 3 – Scipione Rebiba, Italian cardinal (d. 1577)
 March 31 – Guru Angad, Indian religious leader (d. 1552)
 April 12 – Alessandro Campeggio, Italian cardinal (d. 1554)
 April 30 – Francesco Primaticcio, Italian painter (d. 1570)
 May 5 – Stanislaus Hosius, Polish cardinal (d. 1579)
 May 29 – Antun Vrančić, Croatian archbishop (d. 1573)
 June 24 – Johannes Mathesius, German theologian (d. 1565)
 July 18 – Heinrich Bullinger, Swiss religious reformer (d. 1575)
 August 1 – Dorothea of Denmark, Duchess of Prussia, Danish princess (d. 1547)
 August 6 – Matthew Parker, English Archbishop of Canterbury (d. 1574)
 September 4 – John V, Prince of Anhalt-Zerbst, Prince of Anahlt-Dessau (1516–1544) and Anhalt-Zerbst (1544–1551) (d. 1551)
 September 20 – Philip III, Count of Nassau-Weilburg (d. 1559)
 October 29 – Shin Saimdang, Korean calligraphist and noted poet (d. 1551)
 November – Giovanni Battista Giraldi, Italian novelist and poet (d. 1573)
 November 13 – Philip I, Landgrave of Hesse (d. 1567)
 December – Nicholas Udall, English playwright and schoolmaster (d. 1556)
 December 31 – Beatrice of Portugal, Duchess of Savoy (d. 1538)
 date unknown
 Ali ibn Ahmad al-Samhudi (علي بن أحمد السمهودي), Egyptian Sunni Islamic scholar, author of Wafa al-Wafa bi akhbar Dar al-Mustafa
 John Dudley, 1st Duke of Northumberland, English Tudor nobleman and politician (executed 1553)
 Patrick Hamilton, Scottish churchman and Reformer (burned at the stake 1528)
 Dirk Philips, early Dutch Anabaptist writer and theologian (d. 1568)

Deaths 

 January 9 – Gaspare Nadi, Italian builder (b. 1418)
 January 27 – Ludovico II, Marquess of Saluzzo (b. 1438)
 February 17 – Eberhard II, Duke of Württemberg (b. 1447)
 April 15 – Filippino Lippi, Italian painter (b. 1457)
 May 31 – Engelbert II of Nassau (b. 1451)
 June – Lê Hiến Tông, Emperor of the Lê Dynasty
 June 19 – Bernhard Walther, German astronomer and humanist (b. 1430)
 July 2 – Stephen the Great, Prince of Moldova (b. 1434)
 July 29 – Thomas Stanley, 1st Earl of Derby (b. 1435)
 August – Domenico Maria Novara da Ferrara, Italian astronomer (b. 1454)
 August 20 – Ruprecht of the Palatinate (Bishop of Freising) (b. 1481)
 August 22 – Philipp II, Count of Hanau-Lichtenberg (1489–1503) (b. 1462)
August 28 – John Paston, English gentleman known from the Paston Letters (b. 1444)
 September 10 – Philibert II, Duke of Savoy (b. 1480)
 September 15 – Elisabeth of Bavaria (b. 1478)
 September 22 – Jan II the Mad, Duke of Żagań (1439–1449 and 1461–1468 and again in 1472) (b. 1435)
 September 24 – Bartolomeo della Rocca ("Cocles"), Italian astrologer (b. 1467)
 October 12 – John Corvinus, Hungarian noble (b. 1473)
 November 9 – King Frederick IV of Naples (b. 1452)
 November 26 – Queen Isabella I of Castile (b. 1451)
 December – Lê Túc Tông, Emperor of the Lê Dynasty
 December 21 – Berthold von Henneberg, German archbishop and elector (b. 1442)
 date unknown
 Abdal-Karim Khan Astrakhani, Khan of Astrakhan
 Abu Abdallah IV, Sultan of Tlemcen
 Abu Abd Allah al-Sheikh Muhammad ibn Yahya, first Wattasid Sultan of Morocco and King of Fez
 Éamonn Mág Samhradháin, Lord of Tullyhaw
 Fathullah Imad-ul-Mulk, Indian-born founder of the Berar Sultanate
 Garci Rodríguez de Montalvo, Spanish author
 Qasim Barid I, founder of the Bidar Sultanate
 Vira Ravi Ravi Varma, Raja of Venad
 Choe Bu, Korean official and venturer to China (b. 1454)

References